Issam Haitham Taweel (born 10 July 1989) is an Egyptian tennis player. Haitham Taweel began playing tennis at the age of 13. He has trained in Syria, Spain, United States and Egypt.

In August 2019, Taweel was suspended for five years for match-fixing and other corruption offences, after being investigated by the Tennis Integrity Unit and found guilty of all charges under the Tennis Anti-Corruption Program.

See also
Match fixing in tennis
 Syria Davis Cup team

References

External links
 
 
 

1989 births
Living people
Egyptian male tennis players
Syrian male tennis players
Sportspeople from Aleppo
Match fixers
Tennis controversies
Match fixing in tennis